Louvain or  Leuven is the capital of the province of Flemish Brabant in the Flemish Region, Belgium.

Louvain may also refer to:
 Louvain-la-Neuve, a planned city in the municipality of Ottignies-Louvain-la-Neuve, Belgium
 Académie Louvain, a network of French-speaking Catholic universities in Belgium active between 2004 and 2015
 Counts of Louvain, a branch of the Lotharingian House of Reginar
 Louvain Coopération, a Belgian international non-governmental organization

See also
Louvain Modularity, a method to detect communities in graphs
 University of Leuven (disambiguation)